The Girl Who Loves a Soldier is a 1916 British silent war film directed by Alexander Butler and starring Vesta Tilley, Sydney Folker and James Lindsay. It was made at Isleworth Studios. During the First World War a nurse disguises herself as a man and carries her wounded fiancé's important military dispatches.

Cast
 Vesta Tilley as Vesta Beaumont  
 Sydney Folker as Chris Barker  
 James Lindsay as Lord Strathmore  
 Norman Cheyne as Billy Williams / Bob Purdy 
 Rutland Barrington as Mr. Beaumont  
 Gordon Sackville as Judd Hampton

References

Bibliography
 Harris, Ed. Britain's Forgotten Film Factory: The Story of Isleworth Studios. Amberley Publishing, 2013.

External links

1916 films
1916 war films
British silent feature films
British war films
Films directed by Alexander Butler
British World War I films
Films shot at Isleworth Studios
British black-and-white films
1910s English-language films
1910s British films